Vela is a commune in Dolj County, Oltenia, Romania with a population of 2,420 people. It is composed of eight villages: Bucovicior, Cetățuia, Desnățui, Gubaucea, Segleț, Suharu, Știubei, Vela.

References

Communes in Dolj County
Localities in Oltenia